Narongrit Boonsuk (born 4 June 1992) is a Thai professional footballer who plays as a centre back for Thai League 1 club Khonkaen United.

References

1992 births
Living people
Narongrit Boonsuk
Narongrit Boonsuk
Association football defenders
Narongrit Boonsuk
Narongrit Boonsuk
Narongrit Boonsuk
Narongrit Boonsuk
Narongrit Boonsuk
Narongrit Boonsuk